The 2011 Rutland County Council election took place on 5 May 2011. The whole of Rutland County Council was up for election.

Overall election results

Rutland County Council - summary of overall results

Rutland County Council - results by ward

Braunston and Belton

Cottesmore

Exton

Greetham

Ketton

Langham

Lyddington

Martinsthorpe

Normanton

Oakham North East

Oakham North West

Oakham South East

Oakham South West

Ryhall and Casterton

Uppingham

Whissendine

By-elections between May 2011 - May 2015

By-elections are called when a representative councillor resigns or dies, so are unpredictable.  A by-election is held to fill a political office that has become vacant between the scheduled elections.

Ketton - 27 June 2013

Oakham South West  - 16 October 2014

Whissendine  - 16 October 2014

References

2011 English local elections
2011